Mikael Antero Granlund (born 26 February 1992) is a Finnish professional ice hockey centre for the Pittsburgh Penguins of the National Hockey League (NHL). He previously played professionally in Finland with Oulun Kärpät and HIFK of the SM-liiga and the Minnesota Wild of the NHL. He was selected by the Wild as the ninth overall pick in the 2010 NHL Entry Draft.

Playing career

Early career
Granlund played junior ice hockey with Oulun Kärpät in 2007–08 and 2008–09, averaging greater than a point per game in both seasons, and was named a first-team All-Star by his junior A league in 2009. He gained his first professional experience late that season, making his debut with Kärpät's team in the SM-liiga on his 17th birthday. He played only two games before he became embroiled in a contract dispute with the team. Granlund and his agent alleged the four-year junior contract he signed with Kärpät in 2007 was invalid because it failed to define what compensation he would get from the team, and that the team had altered the end date on his SM-liiga insurance application from April 2009 to April 2011 without his approval. The team admitted mistakes were made, but that they were made in good faith as both the team and player wished to get him in their top team immediately.

Arguing his contracts to be void, and considering himself to be a free agent, Granlund signed a contract with HIFK Helsinki for the 2009–10 season; Kärpät challenged his attempts to transfer to HIFK. Granlund sued his old team in July 2009 after Kärpät failed to relent, asking a court to cancel his contracts with them and clear the way for him to play with HIFK. The two sides reached a settlement a month later, allowing Granlund to transfer to his new team. He scored 13 goals and 27 assists in 43 games with HIFK in 2009–10, and led all rookies in scoring with 40 points. He was named the winner of the Jarmo Wasama memorial trophy as the SM-liiga's top rookie, and with only two penalty minutes in the entire season, he also won the Raimo Kilpiö trophy as the league's most gentlemanly player. Additionally, Granlund was voted Finland's young Athlete of the Year for 2009.

Granlund has played with the Finnish national junior team at both the Under-18 and Under-20 World Championships in 2009 and 2010. At the 2010 U18 Championship, Granlund led the tournament in assists with 9, while his 13 total points were third-best as he helped Finland win its second consecutive bronze medal. At the 2010 World Junior Championship, he was Finland's top scorer with seven points as the team finished fifth overall.

Among skaters, Granlund was considered the top European prospect for the 2010 NHL Entry Draft by the NHL Central Scouting Bureau. While scouts have noted his small size at five feet, ten inches, they were impressed with his vision on the ice. Granlund was ultimately selected ninth overall in the Draft by the Minnesota Wild.

As Granlund's contract ran through the 2010–11 season, he returned to HIFK for one more season. Suffering a concussion in mid-October, Granlund was sidelined for over two months, missing the 2011 World Junior Championship as a result. Acting primarily as a playmaker, Granlund was a key player in helping HIFK win the SM-liiga title. Granlund was second in playoff scoring (5–11–16) behind teammate Juha-Pekka Haataja (8–8–16).

Following the 2010–11 SM-liiga season, Granlund made his debut with the senior Finnish national team for the 2011 IIHF World Championship. Using the "Mike Legg Michigan style scoop" in a full-speed variation, Granlund scored a lacrosse style highlight reel goal in the semifinal game against Russia, helping Finland win gold.

In May 2011, Dinamo Minsk of the Kontinental Hockey League (KHL) publicly claimed his playing rights because it drafted him one year before his selection by the NHL's Minnesota Wild. However, because of Finland's mandatory military service requirements, Granlund remained with HIFK through the 2011–12 season. Granlund himself has stated he was not interested in playing in the KHL but planned to play in the NHL.

Minnesota Wild
Granlund signed a three-year, entry-level contract with the Minnesota Wild during the 2012 NHL off-season. With the NHL lockout postponing the 2012–13 season, Granlund was assigned to the Wild's American Hockey League (AHL) affiliate, the Houston Aeros, to begin the 2012–13 campaign. After the lockout ended, Granlund was recalled from Houston and made the Wild's opening night roster. In the first game of the Wild's season, he made his NHL debut and scored his first NHL goal, against Semyon Varlamov of the Colorado Avalanche on 19 January 2013.

Granlund's play improved during his sophomore year, scoring 8 goals and 33 assists. Midway through the season, Granlund was moved to Minnesota's top line where he was frequently paired with Jason Pominville and Zach Parise. On 21 April 2014, Granlund scored a goal in overtime to lead the Wild to a playoff victory over Colorado.

In the 2014–15 season, Granlund again played on Minnesota's top line alongside Pominville and Parise, where he recorded 8 goals and 31 assists.

The 2015–16 season saw Granlund centre the Wild's second line with a variety of wingers due to Minnesota's struggle with injuries and line-shuffling. Near the end of the season, interim head coach John Torchetti placed him on the first line wing with fellow Finn Mikko Koivu, leading to a sudden uptick in points production, something Torchetti attributed to being released from the defensive duties often placed on centremen. He played well in the Wild's short playoff run, with Torchetti calling him the Wild's "best competitor".

On 1 August 2017, the Wild re-signed Granlund to a three-year, $17.25 million contract with an annual average of $5.75 million, thereby avoiding salary arbitration.

Nashville Predators
During the 2018–19 season, having registered 49 points through 63 games, Granlund was traded by the Wild at the trade deadline to the Nashville Predators in exchange for Kevin Fiala on 25 February 2019. In his first 16 games with the Predators, he struggled to score goals; he managed to do so only once in that time frame.

On 29 September 2020, Granlund informed the Predators he would not be re-signing and that he would test free agency. However, he was unable to secure a satisfactory contract elsewhere, and would end up re-signing with Nashville on a one-year, $3.75 million contract on 23 December 2020.

On 28 July 2021, Granlund re-signed with Nashville on a four-year, $20 million contract.

Pittsburgh Penguins
On 1 March 2023, Granlund was traded to the Pittsburgh Penguins in exchange for a second-round pick in the 2023 NHL Entry Draft.

In popular culture
After Granlund's "lacrosse-style" goal at the 2011 IIHF World Championship semifinal against Russia, Finnish Hockey Mafia released the single "Taivas varjele!" featuring sampled comments by Finnish sports broadcaster Antero Mertaranta. The single released the same week of the much-talked about goal reached #2 in the Finnish Singles Chart as well as topping the chart for most Finnish Singles downloads that week.

Personal life
Granlund is the older brother of Markus Granlund who is a player for HC Lugano. He is a supporter of Liverpool FC.

Career statistics

Regular season and playoffs

International

Awards and honours

References

External links

 
 Mikael Granlund's NHL Draft Prospect Card

1992 births
Living people
Finnish ice hockey right wingers
Finnish ice hockey world championship gold medalists
HIFK (ice hockey) players
Houston Aeros (1994–2013) players
Ice hockey players at the 2014 Winter Olympics
Medalists at the 2014 Winter Olympics
Minnesota Wild draft picks
Minnesota Wild players
Nashville Predators players
National Hockey League first-round draft picks
Olympic bronze medalists for Finland
Olympic ice hockey players of Finland
Olympic medalists in ice hockey
Oulun Kärpät players
Pittsburgh Penguins players
Sportspeople from Oulu